Chicco Testa (born 5 January 1952 in Bergamo) is an Italian politician. He graduated in philosophy at the Università Statale in Milan (1976). He lives in Rome and has two sons.

Environmentalist and politician for PCI and PDS 
From 1980 to 1987 Testa was national secretary and then national president of Legambiente environmentalist association.
As such, Testa leads the environmentalist mobilization in Italy after the Chernobyl disaster, reaching its high in the manifestation of May 10, 1986 with more than 200,000 people. More than 1 million signatures are gathered to present an anti-nuclear referendum, passed in 1987, following which Italian nuclear plants were decommissioned.

From 1987 to 1994 for two legislatures, he was elected to the Italian Chamber of Deputies in the lists of the Italian Communist Party (PCI) in 1987 and of the Democratic Left Party (PDS) in 1992, seating in the parliamentary commission for the environment and the territory.

From 1994 to 1996 he was Chairman of the Board of ACEA (Rome’s Electricity and Water Co.)

Management activities 
From 1996 to 2002 he was chairman of the board of Enel Spa, the most important Electrical Italian Company. During this period, Enel was privatized (Europe’s largest-ever IPO of 15 billion Euro) and in 1997 there was the start- up of Wind, the third TLC Italian Company in which Testa was elected member of the Board of Directors.

From 2002 to 2004 he was member of the board of directors of the Riello group, Italian leader company in heating systems and appliances.

From 2002 to 2005 he was member of the advisory board of Carlyle Europe, affiliate of The Carlyle Group (Private Equity), chairman of the board of directors of STA Spa (The Mobility Agency of the City of Rome) and Chairman of the Kyoto Club (non-profit organization whose purpose is the achievement of the objectives set by the Kyoto Protocol).

At present Testa is managing director of Rothschild Spa. Also he is member of the board of directors of Allianz Spa, chairman of the board of Telit Communications Plc and chairman of the board of E.V.A. – Energie Valsabbia – a company developing hydropower generation plants. He has been also chairman of the organising committee of the 20th World Energy Congress, promoted by WEC, World Energy Council and held in Rome in November 2007.

Journalistic and academic activities 

Testa is a journalist and he contributes to some of the most important daily and weekly Italian newspapers.

He was lecturer at the LUISS School Management in Rome (MBA Program Economics and Management in Public Utilities) and he was Lecturer at the Universities of Macerata and Naples in Economic and Environmental subjects.

Together with Fabio Corsico and Gianni Lo Storto, he's member of the board of "Formiche" (Ants), a printed and online cultural and editorial magazine dealing with politics, economics, geographic, environmental and cultural issues, established in 2004 by Paolo Messa.

Lobbyist for the return to nuclear power in Italy 

In 2008 he wrote a book “Tornare al Nucleare?, L’Italia, l’energia, l’ambiente” (Back to Nuclear Energy? Italy, Energy, Environment), published by Einaudi.

Since July 2010 Testa is Chairman of the Forum Nucleare Italiano (Italian Nuclear Forum): a non-profit organisation comprising industrialists and universities, with the aim of reviving the public opinion debate about nuclear energy, to which Italy renounced in 1987 after a referendum. All the major energy industries, as well as some universities and a pair of centrist trade unions, are taking part in the FNI: Alstom power, Ansaldo nucleare, Areva, Confindustria, E.On, Edf, Edison, Enel, Federprogetti, Flaei-Cisl, GDF Suez, Politecnico di Milano, Sapienza - Università di Roma, SOGIN, Stratinvest Energy, Techint, Technip, Tecnimont, Terna, Uilcem, Università di Genova, Università di Palermo, Università di Pisa, Westinghouse.

Notes

External links 

https://web.archive.org/web/20090711162351/http://www.chiccotesta.it/ 

1952 births
Living people
Italian bankers